Rote Hilfe e.V. ("Red Aid," abbreviated RH) is a German far-left prisoner support group.  RH was founded in 1975, although localized groups calling themselves "Rote Hilfe" had begun to appear at the end of the 1960s. The group views itself as a successor to the Weimar-era Rote Hilfe.  In the 1970s, it worked on behalf of Red Army Faction prisoners, and a few RH members went on to join the RAF or similar groups (e.g., Angelika Speitel and Hans-Joachim Klein).  Today half of Rote Hilfe's budget is spent paying the legal fees, fines, and expenses of left-wing prisoners.  It also publishes a quarterly journal, Die Rote Hilfe ("Red Aid"), and other publications, organizes events, etc. The Federal Office for the Protection of the Constitution considers it a "left-wing extremist" organization.  RH is headquartered in Göttingen and, as of 2008, had about 5,000 members.

See also
 International Red Aid

Notes

External links
 

Far-left politics in Germany
Red Army Faction
Political organisations based in Germany
Prison-related organizations